Florindo Ferrario (25 January 1897 – 30 May 1960) was an Argentine film, stage and radio actor. He appeared in thirty films from 1930 to 1958.

Filmography

References

External links

1897 births
1960 deaths
Male actors from Buenos Aires
Argentine male film actors
Argentine male radio actors
Argentine male stage actors